Westbourne Green is an area of Westbourne, London, the centre of the former hamlet of Westbourne, at the north-western corner of the City of Westminster. It is named for its location west of a bourne (small stream).

Traditionally a rural area, small-scale building had begun by the 17th century. In the early 19th century much more sustained development occurred as a result of the building of the Grand Union Canal and railways through the area.

Education

Transport and locale
Nearby places
Paddington
Notting Hill
Bayswater
Warwick Avenue

The nearest London Underground stations are Westbourne Park and Royal Oak on the Hammersmith & City line. Warwick Avenue, on the Bakerloo line, is situated a short distance to the northeast.

References

Districts of the City of Westminster
Areas of London
Westbourne, London
Places formerly in Middlesex